The 2015 FIBA Europe Under-18 Championship for Women was the 32nd edition of the European Under-18 Women's Basketball Championship. 16 teams participated in the competition, held in Celje, Slovenia, from 30 July to 9 August 2015.

Participating teams

  (Runners-up, 2014 FIBA Europe Women's Under-18 Championship Division B)

  (Winners, 2014 FIBA Europe Women's Under-18 Championship Division B)
  (3rd place, 2014 FIBA Europe Women's Under-18 Championship Division B)

First round
The first-round groups draw took place on 30 November 2014 in Budapest, Hungary. In the first round, the sixteen teams are allocated in four groups of four teams each. The top three teams of each group will qualify to the Second Round. The last team of each group will play in the Classification Group G first, then in the 9th–16th place playoffs.

All times are local – Central European Summer Time (UTC+2).

Group A

Group B

Group C

Group D

Second round
Twelve advancing teams from the First Round will be allocated in two groups of six teams each. The top four teams of each group will advance to the quarterfinals. The last two teams of each group will play in the 9th–16th place playoffs against the teams from the Group G.

Group E

Group F

Classification Group G
Last placed team from each group of first round competes in classification round-robin group for lower four seeds in 9th–16th place playoff.

Classification playoffs for 9th – 16th place

Classification games for 9th – 16th place

Classification games for 13th – 16th place

Classification games for 9th – 12th place

Championship playoffs

Quarterfinals

Classification games for 5th – 8th place

Semifinals
Winners of this round moves on to the Final; while the losers contest for the bronze medal.

Final classification games

Match for 15th place

Match for 13th place

Match for 11th place

Match for 9th place

Match for 7th place

Match for 5th place

Bronze medal match

Final

Final standings

Awards 

All-Tournament Team

 Ángela Salvadores (MVP)
 Lisa Berkani
 Alexia Chartereau
 Francesca Pan
 Raisa Musina

References

External links
FIBA official website

2016
2015–16 in European women's basketball
2015–16 in Slovenian basketball
International youth basketball competitions hosted by Slovenia
International women's basketball competitions hosted by Slovenia